Harold R. Gaydon was a sailor from Great Britain, who represented his country at the 1928 Summer Olympics in Amsterdam, Netherlands.

Sources 
 

Sailors at the 1928 Summer Olympics – 12' Dinghy
Olympic sailors of Great Britain
British male sailors (sport)